Joseph Cross (December 29, 1843 – October 29, 1913) was a New Jersey politician and United States district judge of the United States District Court for the District of New Jersey.

Education and career

Born near Morristown, New Jersey, Cross attended  the College of New Jersey (now Princeton University), receiving an Artium Baccalaureus degree in 1865 and an Artium Magister degree in 1868. He attended Columbia Law School, but read law to enter the profession. He had a private practice in Elizabeth, New Jersey from 1869 to 1905. During that period, he was also a Judge of the state District Court of Elizabeth from 1888 to 1891, and a member of the New Jersey General Assembly from 1893 to 1895, serving as its Speaker in 1895, and as a member of the New Jersey Senate from 1899 to 1905, serving as President of the Senate in 1905.

Federal judicial service

On March 13, 1905, Cross was nominated by President Theodore Roosevelt to a new seat on the United States District Court for the District of New Jersey created by 33 Stat. 987. Cross was confirmed by the United States Senate on March 17, 1905, and received his commission that day. He served on the court until his death on October 29, 1913.

References

Sources
 

Princeton University alumni
Columbia Law School alumni
1843 births
1913 deaths
People from Morristown, New Jersey
Speakers of the New Jersey General Assembly
Democratic Party members of the New Jersey General Assembly
Democratic Party New Jersey state senators
Politicians from Morris County, New Jersey
Presidents of the New Jersey Senate
Judges of the United States District Court for the District of New Jersey
United States district court judges appointed by Theodore Roosevelt
20th-century American judges
19th-century American politicians
United States federal judges admitted to the practice of law by reading law
19th-century American judges